The Treasure of Monte Cristo is a 1961 British film directed by Monty Berman and Robert S. Baker.

The film features Rory Calhoun as an army captain in 1815 who goes off in search of a treasure on the island of Monte Cristo. It is a prequel to Alexandre Dumas' 1844 novel The Count of Monte Cristo. 

The film takes the same name as an unofficial sequel novel to The Count of Monte Cristo, namely The Treasure of Monte Cristo, written by Jules Lermina in 1885. In the United States it was released under the alternative title The Secret of Monte Cristo.

Cast
Rory Calhoun as Captain Adam Corbett 
Patricia Bredin as Pauline 
John Gregson as Renato 
Peter Arne as Boldini 
Ian Hunter as Colonel Jackson
David Davies as Van Ryman
Sam Kydd as Albert 
Francis Matthews as Louis Auclair
Gianna Maria Canale as Lucetta Di Marca

References

External links
 

1961 films
Films directed by Robert S. Baker
Films directed by Monty Berman
Films shot at Pinewood Studios
Metro-Goldwyn-Mayer films
Films based on The Count of Monte Cristo
Films scored by Clifton Parker
Films set in Italy
Films set in the Mediterranean Sea
Films set on islands
Treasure hunt films
Films set in 1815
British historical films
1960s historical films
1960s English-language films
1960s British films